Mount Fortune is a summit in Banff National Park in Alberta, Canada.

References

Two-thousanders of Alberta
Mountains of Banff National Park